3 Count Bout is a wrestling arcade game released by SNK in 1993.

Gameplay 

Players can play as one of 10 fictional professional wrestlers to fight for the SWF championship title. Along with the standard wrestling match, fights locations include venues such as car parks and factories (turning it into a hardcore wrestling match, with less restrictions and the ability to use weapons). In addition to that, two players can join in together for two-on-two tag-team matches.

A feature of this game is its system. Gauges are displayed on the screen when you approach an opponent's wrestler during the match. The player can give priority to the technique by hitting the button repeatedly until the gauge meter is higher than the opponent's. Additionally, there are dashing techniques from a long distance, aerial killing from the top rope, promised foul attack, and middle distance batting techniques. Not only ordinary classic match rings venues are available, but also the street can be a match location as well.

The game consists of 5 championships with their own stages. The first stage type is a wrestling ring where the opponents can bounce from the edges and can be out of bounds. The second stage type is street wrestling, where there are objects to destroy and weapons to wield. The last stage is the electricity stage where the borders are harmful and weapons are used. Press the A button to punch. Press the B button to kick. Press the C button to jump. Press the A and B buttons simultaneously for a quick moving retreat. Pull the joystick twice in a direction to rush that way. If the player rushes in the direction of a boxing ring edge, they can bounce back. If the player is down, repeatedly press the A button and pull the joystick left and right to get up. Press the C button to body drop on a downed opponent. Press the A button many times rapidly to use a special attack. Press Button A or B on a downed opponent to grab and wrestle. When the player and opponent clash in a wrestle, press the A and B buttons as fast as possible to push back. Press Button D to pin down a downed opponent and hold him for 3 seconds to win. Alternatively, some fighters have holds which can force an opponent with low stamina to submit.

Story 
SWF (SNK wrestling federation) is an organization that stands at the top of the professional wrestling world. The SWF decided to hold the "Worldwide Indiscriminate Class Tournament". The tournament is to determine the "true world champion" and allows the world's most powerful wrestlers to freely participate in the indiscriminate class with no weight limit. Moreover, the tournament incorporates a radical death match, which seems to be the most severe battle in the history of professional wrestling.

Powerful people from all over the world entered, including the current SWF heavyweight champion and some ferocious wrestlers from the dark underground professional wrestling organization "Hole of the Lion".

Development and release 

The game was released for the Neo Geo AES on April 23, 1993 and was later ported to the Neo Geo CD on April 21, 1995. 3 Count Bout was released for PlayStation 4, Xbox One and Switch on October 11, 2018.

Reception 

In Japan, Game Machine listed 3 Count Bout on their May 1, 1993 issue as being the tenth most-popular arcade game at the time. In North America, RePlay reported 3 Count Bout to be the fourth most-popular arcade game in April 1993. The following month, RePlay listed it as the top-grossing arcade software conversion kit, while Play Meter listed 3 Count Bout as the 47th most-popular arcade game.

The game received generally positive reception from critics since its release in arcades and other platforms. AllGames Paul Biondich noted its attempt at mixing of fighting styles from game such as WWF WrestleFest and Street Fighter II, however, Kyle Knight stated that 3 Count Bout has an "identity crisis" due to this and regarded the controls as decent during fighting mode but poorly implemented during wrestling mode. Both Biondich and Knight felt mixed in regards to the audiovisual presentation, gameplay and overall replay value. In contrast, Consoles Plus Marc Menier and Jean-Loup Jovanovic praised the presentation, visuals, sprite animations, sound design, playability and two-player mode. However, GameFans four reviewers commended the graphical presentation but criticized the limited sprite animation, controls and gameplay mechanics, with Sgt. Gamer in particular recommending to play the title in arcades rather than on AES.

GamePros Scary Larry praised the visuals for being up to standards on Neo Geo and sound design but criticized the controls for being stiff and difficult opponent AI. Hobby Consolas Manuel del Campo highly commended the film-like presentation, music and sound effects but criticized one aspect of its playability and noted the high difficulty level on the easiest setting. Likewise, Joypads Nourdine Nini and Jean-François Morisse gave positive remarks to the number of moves for each character, graphics, animations controls and sound design but criticized the gameplay for being repetitive. In a similar manner as Larry, Mega Funs Philipp Noak and Ulf Schneider criticized the AI opponent for being unfair but gave positive comments to the technical presentation, number of moves and two-player mode.

Player Ones Christophe Delpierre praised the animated visuals, sound, difficulty and longevity but felt mixed in regards to the gameplay. Computer+Videogiochis Paolo Cardillo and Consolemanias Piemarco Rosa also praised the animated graphics, audio, gameplay and number of moves but Cardillo criticized the game's originality, while Rosa criticized certain gameplay aspects and longevity. Play Times Armin Thielen highly commended the title for the technical and audiovisual presentation, as well as its difficulty level. A reviewer of Dutch magazine Power Unlimited reviewed the AES version in a negative light, stating that "The sounds and images may be beautiful, what good is it if the game is unplayable? 3 Count Bout feels like it's impossible to win, and of course you shouldn't have it." VideoGames Chris Bieniek criticized the method of executing special moves.

Notes

References

External links 
 3 Count Bout at Giant Bomb
 3 Count Bout at Killer List of Videogames
 3 Count Bout at MobyGames

1993 video games
ACA Neo Geo games
Arcade video games
D4 Enterprise games
Fighting games
Multiplayer and single-player video games
Neo Geo games
Neo Geo CD games
Nintendo Switch games
PlayStation Network games
PlayStation 4 games
Xbox One games
Professional wrestling games
SNK games
Video games scored by Masahiko Hataya
Virtual Console games
Windows games
Video games developed in Japan